John Melling may refer to:

 John Melling (cricketer) (1848–1881), English cricketer
 John Melling (wrestler) (born 1971), British wrestler
 John Kennedy Melling (1927–2018), British accountant and writer and broadcaster on theatre.